The 1949 National Football League Draft was held on December 21, 1948, at The Bellevue-Stratford Hotel in Philadelphia. The draft was preceded by a secret  draft meeting held November 15, 1948, at the Hotel Schenley in Pittsburgh.

This was the third year that the first overall pick was a bonus pick determined by lottery, with the previous two winners (Chicago Bears in 1947 and Washington Redskins in 1948) ineligible from the draw; it was won by the Philadelphia Eagles, who selected center/linebacker Chuck Bednarik.

Player selections

Round one

Round two

Round three

Round four

Round five

Round six

Round seven

Round eight

Round nine

Round ten

Round eleven

Round twelve

Round thirteen

Round fourteen

Round fifteen

Round sixteen

Round seventeen

Round eighteen

Round nineteen

Round twenty

Round twenty-one

Round twenty-two

Round twenty-three

Round twenty-four

Round twenty-five

Hall of Famers
 Chuck Bednarik, center from the University of Pennsylvania taken 1st round 1st overall by the Philadelphia Eagles.
Inducted: Professional Football Hall of Fame class of 1967.
 Norm Van Brocklin, quarterback from the University of Oregon taken 4th round 37th overall by the Los Angeles Rams.
Inducted: Professional Football Hall of Fame class of 1971.
 George Blanda, quarterback from the University of Kentucky taken 12th round 119th overall by the Chicago Bears.
Inducted: Professional Football Hall of Fame class of 1981.
 Doak Walker, halfback from Southern Methodist University taken 1st round 3rd overall by the Boston Yanks.
Inducted: Professional Football Hall of Fame class of 1986.
 Jim Finks, quarterback from Tulsa taken 12th round 116th overall by the Pittsburgh Steelers.
Inducted: For his achievements as an Executive Professional Football Hall of Fame class of 1995.
 Although not an inductee, Wallace Triplett's photograph hangs in the Hall of Fame in recognition of his being the first African-American to be drafted by and play for a National Football League team.

Notable undrafted players

References

External links
 NFL.com – 1949 Draft
 databaseFootball.com – 1949 Draft
 Pro Football Hall of Fame

National Football League Draft
Draft
NFL Draft
1940s in Philadelphia
NFL Draft
American football in Philadelphia
Events in Philadelphia